Patty Fendick and Meredith McGrath were the defending champions but they competed with different partners that year, Fendick with Mary Joe Fernández and McGrath with Rennae Stubbs.

McGrath and Stubbs lost in the first round to Nicole Bradtke and Kristine Radford.

Fendick and Fernández lost in the final 7–5, 2–6, 6–4 against Lindsay Davenport and Jana Novotná.

Seeds
Champion seeds are indicated in bold text while text in italics indicates the round in which those seeds were eliminated.

 Lindsay Davenport /  Jana Novotná (champions)
 Meredith McGrath /  Rennae Stubbs (first round)
 Barbara Rittner /  Marianne Werdel (first round)
 Patty Fendick /  Mary Joe Fernández (final)

Draw

External links
 1995 Peters International Women's Doubles Draw

Women's Doubles
Doubles